Muhammad Latasab Satti is a Pakistani politician who had been a member of the Provincial Assembly of the Punjab from August 2018 till January 2023

Early life and education
He was born on 10 October 1950 in Rawalpindi, Pakistan.

He is a retired Major from Pakistan Army and has received graduation level education.

Political career

He was elected to the Provincial Assembly of the Punjab as a candidate of Pakistan Tehreek-e-Insaf (PTI) from Constituency PP-6 (Rawalpindi-I) in 2018 Pakistani general election. He received 64,642 votes and defeated Raja Ashfaq Sarwar, a candidate of Pakistan Muslim League Nawaz (PML-N).

References

Living people
Punjab MPAs 2018–2023
Pakistan Tehreek-e-Insaf MPAs (Punjab)
1950 births